This battle took place on 31 July 1712 southeast of Rügen, in the Baltic Sea, during the Great Northern War. The site is known as Neues Tief in German, Nydyp in Danish, and Nya Djupet in Swedish. The action was inconclusive.

Ships involved
The name of the ship is followed by the number of guns carried.

Denmark (Sehested)
Ditmarsken 46 (v.adm. Christen Thomesen Sehested; capt.com. Christian Thomsen Carl)
Kongens Jagt Krone 24 
Ark Noa 16 
Ebenetzer 15
Helleflynder 14

Sweden (Henck)
Stralsund 30
Anklam 30
St Thomas 30
St Johannes 30
Witduve 22
Jomfru 14
Sjökane I 8
Sjökane II 8
? 6 (pram)
? 6 (galley)
? (bomb)
1 crayer (kreiert) - Scuttled 2/3 August, captured 5/6 August, refloated 6 August, fought on Danish side on 17 August
11 transports

References

Conflicts in 1712
1712
1712 in Denmark